Russula decolorans is an edible Russula mushroom found in groups in coniferous forests.

Description
The cap is convex, with a depressed centre when old, often brick-red and slippery when young. The cap grows up to 10 cm. The flesh is white and turns grey when old. It has a mild taste. The spores are pale ochre.

Uses
The edible mushroom is commonly harvested for food in Finland.

See also
List of Russula species

References

Further reading
E. Garnweidner. Mushrooms and Toadstools of Britain and Europe. Collins. 1994.

External links

decolorans
Fungi of Europe
Edible fungi